The 2010 Australian Manufacturers' Championship was a CAMS sanctioned national motor racing championship for car manufacturers. It was the 25th manufacturers title to be awarded by CAMS and the 16th to be contested under the Australian Manufacturers' Championship name. The championship, which was open to closed, four seat, production automobiles, also incorporated the 2010 Australian Production Car Championship for drivers. Mitsubishi Motors won their second consecutive Manufacturers' Championship, while Stuart Kostera, driving a Mitsubishi, won the Production Car Championship.

Calendar
The championship was contested over a six round series.
 Round 1, Amour All Bathurst 12 Hour, Mount Panorama Circuit, Bathurst, New South Wales, 13–14 February
 Round 2, Symmons Plains Raceway, Tasmania, 10–11 April
 Round 3, Phillip Island Grand Prix Circuit, Victoria, 1–2 May
 Round 4, Dial Before You Dig Australian Six Hour, Eastern Creek Raceway, New South Wales, 17–18 July
 Round 5, Morgan Park Raceway, Queensland, 28–29 August
 Round 6, Sandown Raceway, Victoria, 23–24 October

All rounds other than Rounds 1 & 4 were contested over two one-hour races.

Class Structure
Cars competed in the following six classes: 
 Class A : High Performance (All Wheel Drive)
 Class B : High Performance (Two Wheel Drive)
 Class C : Performance
 Class D : Production
 Class E : Production
 Class F : Alternative Energy

Points system
Only registered manufacturers were eligible to score points in the Australian Manufacturers' Championship. Each registered manufacturer could nominate up to two cars, irrespective of class, which were the only cars eligible to score points for that manufacturer at that round of the championship.
 In each single race round, points towards the Australian Manufacturers' Championship were awarded on a 120-90-72-61-54-48-42-36-30-24-18-12-6 basis for the first thirteen places in each class. 3 points were awarded for all other finishers.
 In each two race round, points towards the Australian Manufacturers Championship were awarded on a 60-45-36-30-27-24-21-18-15-12-9-6-3 basis for the first thirteen places in each class in each race. 2 points were awarded for all other finishers in each race.

Drivers registered for the Australian Production Car Championship were eligible to score points towards that title regardless of Manufacturer registration.
 Two points were awarded for the driver setting the fastest qualifying lap in each class at each round.
 In each single race round, points towards the Outright and Class titles in the Australian Production Car Championship were awarded on a 120-90-72-61-54-48-42-36-30-24-18-12-6 basis for the first thirteen places in each class. 3 points were awarded for all other finishers.
 In each two race round, points towards the Outright and Class titles in the Australian Production Car Championship were awarded on  60-45-36-30-27-24-21-18-15-12-9-6-3 basis for the first thirteen places in each class in each race. 2 points were awarded for all other finishers in each race.

Championship results

Australian Manufacturers' Championship

Australian Production Car Championship

Race results for top ten drivers

Notes and references

External links
 Production Car Association of Australia  
 Natsoft Race Results Archive

Australian Manufacturers' Championship
Australian Production Car Championship
Manufacturers' Championship